Zhiping is a town in Jiangjin District, Chongqing province, China. , it administers the following six residential communities and two villages:
Jinping Community
Rentuo Community
Zhenwuchang Community
Baixi Community
Huapu Community
Zhongxing Community
Tiantang Village
Renlong Village

See also
List of township-level divisions of Chongqing

References

Township-level divisions of Chongqing